Heri Martínez de Dios is an educator, civic leader, visual communicator, executive producer, entrepreneur, strategist, author of several publications in Puerto Rico, Vice-President and Dean of Technology and Marketing at Atlantic University College (AUC) – a university specializing in sciences and digital arts in Puerto Rico and the Caribbean-, and CEO & Founder at Gladius LLC.

Early years
Heri Martínez de Dios was born in Camagüey, Cuba and arrived in Puerto Rico, his second home, at the age of three. He was interested in the arts from a young age, following steadily in the footsteps of his mother, Dr Teresa de Dios Unanue, co-founder and President of Atlantic University College. His father is the professor and accountant Heriberto Martinez Abreu. Martínez de Dios pursued higher studies at the Colegio Marista in Guaynabo, Puerto Rico. In 1987 he completed a bachelor's degree in Business Administration, and earned six credits for an advanced graduate course in Public Relations. In 1993 he obtained his MBA at the University of Phoenix in Arizona, and in 2002 he graduated as a Master of Graphic Arts with a major in Digital Graphic Design from Atlantic University College in Guaynabo, Puerto Rico. Finally, in 2005 he successfully completed three (3) years of studies leading to a PhD in Educational Technology at Capella University in Minneapolis, USA.

Professional career
For more than 28 years, Martínez de Dios has practiced Higher Education and Technological Innovation. His excellence in his work within the faculty has afforded him prestigious positions such as his promotion in 2007 to Executive Vice-President and Dean of Technology and Marketing at AUC. Also, in January 2014, he founded his own company called Gladius LLC.; a studio that produces Digital Animation, Film, Video Games and Post-production. Among the important films produced by the company Gladius, is its first short film titled Phoebe & Luna. Also, in 2015 he produced the television commercial for Atlantic University College, titled "El Gladiador en ti - 2015".

Achievements and awards
Martínez de Dios has received a number of notable and distinguished, internationally recognized awards, including three Emmy Award nominations in 2011; an Emmy award for Technical Achievement in 2007, an Emmy Award in 2012,the "Executive of the Year" award in 2014 awarded by the Puerto Rico Manufacturers Association; the Zenit Award-Education Sector, awarded by the Puerto Rico Chamber of Commerce in 2014; six statues from the Telly Awards, conferred by the short film produced by himself and called Phoebe & Luna; and 6 figurines Telly Awards conferred by the short film produced by him titled "El Gladiador en Ti 2015".

Named by UNESCO as its Young Educator of the Year in 1993, he was also recognized by Caribbean Business in its 2010 edition of "Executive Father", as well as being selected as one of the "Favorites" in the section titled "Magazine", of "El Nuevo Día" newspaper, being labeled a "success story" on the Apple Computer website in 2001, and receiving a mention and interview with the globally renowned Business Week magazine in 2009. Martínez de Dios has also published several works on the digital arts, Atlantic University College and higher education. His achievements also include having developed over twenty nine (29) leading art labs in all spheres of the digital arts at Atlantic University College. Among those 29, two new exclusive laboratories for the development of courses in Digital Animation; Programming and Videogame Design.

As a lover of art and technology, Martínez de Dios has served as executive producer of several projects in the past years of his career such as: Super Coqui; ProtoGojin goes to Atlantic College. He is currently working on a range of collaborative projects: animation, cell phone apps, TV programs, video games, commercials, books and short films, which will be developed under his direction and co-production, drawing on talent from Atlantic University College and the island of Puerto Rico in general. In 2011, as Executive Producer, he launched a commercial titled "The Gladiator in You" that was produced at Atlantic University College without any outside resources.

Other accomplishments include helping to establish the first bachelor's degree courses in Digital Animation and Video Games in Puerto Rico and the first bachelor's degree courses in the Caribbean, in Digital Cinematography Sciences. Even more significant is his active contribution to the creation of the only master's degree course in Digital Graphic Design. These four (4) programs, which constituted a historical breakthrough in Puerto Rican education, together with the BA in Digital Graphic Design, running with great success for over a decade, are some of the country's most innovative and unique projects.

Also, in 2014, Martínez de Dios, in collaboration with other resources of Atlantic University College, managed to create the first Master of Science in Interactive Media Programming, first of its kind in Puerto Rico and the Caribbean. Likewise for his great contribution to education and entrepreneurship in Puerto Rico, the Puerto Rico Manufacturers Association awarded the Executive of the Year award in 2014. Similarly, in 2014 AUC won the Gold Cup of cinematography at the Festival "Cinema Campus 2014". In 2015, Martinez de Dios was twice nominated for Emmy Awards. Three of the categories for which he was nominated was representing, as executive producer, the commercial of Atlantic University College titled El Gladiador en ti 2015. The other three categories in which Martinez de Dios was nominated was representing his own studio Gladius LLC for his short film titled Phoebe & Luna. This time the TV commercial of Atlantic University College won two of the three categories in which it was nominated. In 2015 he also received a Proclamation of Greeting, by the House of Representatives of Puerto Rico, for the foundation of the studio Gladius LLC and the creation of dozens of jobs on the island of Puerto Rico. In January 2016, Martinez de Dios was also recognized by the Sales and Marketing Executives Association of Puerto Rico, thus giving him the "Top Management Awards 2016" in the category of education.

Philanthropy and community service
Martinez de Dios dedicates a great percentage of his time to work carried out in order to benefit culture and young people. He is a volunteer on the Guaynabo city Community Education Evaluation Committee. Also, from Atlantic University College, he endorses and assists causes and events which support educational, sports, artistic and cultural development in Puerto Rico.

References

External links 
 Atlantic University College Official Website
 Atlantic University College Facebook website

Puerto Rican educators
Puerto Rican writers
University of Phoenix alumni
Living people
Puerto Rican businesspeople
Year of birth missing (living people)